Rudolf Bayer (born 3 March 1939) is a German computer scientist. 

He is professor emeritus of Informatics at the Technical University of Munich where he had been employed since 1972. He is noted for inventing three data sorting structures: the B-tree (with Edward M. McCreight), the UB-tree (with Volker Markl) and the red–black tree. 

Bayer is a recipient of 2001 ACM SIGMOD Edgar F. Codd Innovations Award.  In 2005 he was elected as a fellow of the Gesellschaft für Informatik.

References

External links
 Technical University of Munich page

1939 births
Living people
German computer scientists
Academic staff of the Technical University of Munich
Database researchers
Officers Crosses of the Order of Merit of the Federal Republic of Germany
University of Illinois Urbana-Champaign alumni